Anthony Kelly (born May 30, 1980) is a retired professional lacrosse player that played on the Chesapeake Bayhawks in the MLL (Major League Lacrosse). He has also played for the Rochester Knighthawks and New York Titans in the NLL, the Kentucky Stickhorses in the NALL, and the Los Angeles Riptide, Chicago Machine, Rochester Rattlers, Ohio Machine, and Denver Outlaws of the MLL. He is a faceoff specialist and won a Bronze Medal with U.S. Men's National Indoor Team in 2007. He retired in April 2018.

Biography

Early life
Anthony Kelly was born in North Olmsted, Ohio, on May 30, 1980, to Mike and Linda Kelly. Kelly played for St. Ignatius High School in Cleveland, Ohio, under Ed Aghajanian.

College career
Kelly played at Lacrosse for The Ohio State University for coach Joe Breschi. He had a fantastic college career. Some of his key college accomplishments include:
 Four year starter in college, starting every game of his career at Ohio State University
 Only player in school history to lead the team in ground balls all 4 years of career
 Ranked Nationally in face-off win percentage all 4 years of college career
 Helped the Buckeyes win the GWLL Conference Championship in 2003
 Buckeye Power Club Award Winner

Kelly graduated in 2003 and went on to become the head coach at Hilliard Davidson High School in Hilliard, Ohio – a suburb of Columbus, until the 2007 season.

Professional career
Kelly's professional career started in 2005 with the Minnesota Swarm of the National Lacrosse League (NLL). He was also drafted in the Major League Lacrosse (MLL) supplemental draft that same year by the Los Angeles Riptide. Kelly was named L.A.’s “Newcomer of the Year” by US Lacrosse Magazine and lead L.A. to a #2 Ranking in face-off wins for the 2006 season. Anthony remained with the Riptide in 2007 and enjoyed a great year with 169 face offs won, a career high 62 ground balls, and 6 points. In 2008 Kelly won 184 faceoffs for the Riptide and was selected to participate in his first MLL All Star Game and skills competition.  He won the fastest shot competition with a shot clocked at 109 mph (175.4 km/h).

When the LA Riptide dissolved in 2009, Kelly was picked up by the Chicago Machine where he played two seasons. He was transferred to the Rochester Rattlers for the 2011 season and then was picked up by the new expansion team the Ohio Machine in 2012. After 8 games with the Ohio Machine Kelly was traded to the Denver Outlaws for the rest of the 2012 MLL season.
As a key face off man for Denver, Kelly won 87–149 face offs in 5 games, with a face off win percentage of 58.4%. He helped the Outlaws advance to the MLL Championship to play for the Steinfeld Cup, where they were eventually defeated by the Chesapeake Bayhawks. Kelly returned with the Outlaws in 2013 and helped them to the first perfect regular season in MLL history.  The Outlaws went 14–0 as Anthony won 195 face offs, picked up 59 ground balls, and scored 5 goals. Kelly played 12 games with the Outlaws in 2014 and collected a career high 63 ground ball pickups, despite missing the last two games of the regular season due to injury. He won a total of 159-303 faceoffs in the 2014 regular season and went 14–25 in the final playoff game to help the Outlaws win the 2014 MLL Championship. 2015 was another great year for Kelly as he won 169-298 (56.7%) face offs for the Denver.

In 2016, his 9th season in the MLL, Kelly was traded to the Chesapeake Bayhawks to fill the role of face off specialist.

Statistics

MLL

Regular season

Playoffs

Tournament

NLL

Awards and honors
2002 preseason All-America selection
2003 GWLL Championship 
2003 Academic All Big Ten award recipient
2003 Ohio State University's Team Sportsmanship Award
2006 Named L.A.'s Newcomer of the Year by US Lacrosse Magazine
2007 Won bronze medal with Team USA at the 2007 World Games in Halifax, Nova Scotia
2008 MLL All-Star
2008 Won fastest shot competition at MLL All-Star game with a 109 MPH shot
2009 MLL All-Star
2010 MLL All-Star
2013 MLL All-Star
2014 MLL All-Star
2014 Won MLL Championship with Denver Outlaws
2015 MLL All-Star
2015 Inducted into US Lacrosse North Coast Chapter Hall of Fame
Denver Outlaws career record holder face off win percentage (56.1% 282–503)
MLL career record holder face off attempts (2,746)
MLL career record holder face off wins (1,399)

Personal info
Anthony is the Midwest Sales Manager for STX. He co-founded Resolute Lacrosse in 2009 with his former Ohio State lacrosse teammate and friend, Greg Bice. They are also Co-owners/Operators of The Resolute Athletic Complex, a 74,000 square foot indoor complex with 3 turf fields, a weight room, and training space. He enjoys coaching for Resolute, hunting with his Dad and brother at their family cabin, and playing ice hockey as much as possible in his free time.  Anthony has an Education Degree from the Ohio State University where he graduated in 2003.  Anthony also coached lacrosse collegiately for Denison University (2004), Harvard University (2008) and The Ohio State University (2009).

References

Living people
1980 births
Ohio State Buckeyes men's lacrosse players
American lacrosse players
Major League Lacrosse players
Rochester Knighthawks players
New York Titans (lacrosse) players
Minnesota Swarm players
Denver Outlaws players
Ohio Machine players
Rochester Rattlers players
Sportspeople from Cleveland
People from North Olmsted, Ohio
High school lacrosse coaches in the United States
Chesapeake Bayhawks players
Los Angeles Riptide players
Lacrosse midfielders
Denison Big Red coaches
Harvard Crimson men's lacrosse coaches
Ohio State Buckeyes men's lacrosse coaches